Jan Scott-Frazier (born Scott Frazier) is an American who has worked in various roles of the Japanese anime industry for 20 years, including producer. Frazier was one of the few foreigners to work in the Japanese anime industry.

Career

Frazier moved to Japan in April 1987 and switched into an animation education program that October. She would eventually teach at the school in December 1988. Frazier was in Hangzhou, China when the Tiananmen Square protests of 1989 escalated. During her drive to the airport, she was briefly shot at. During Frazier's career she worked in many roles including animation checker, photographer, inbetweener, and others. Starting in 1992, Frazier set up TAO, a studio in Thailand and ran it for  years. Riots also occurred in Bangkok when Frazier was working there. Izumi Matsumoto in 1994 created the first digital manga, named Comic On, with Frazier producing.

Frazier worked for Production I.G as a technical director and would serve as president of the Japan-based United States branch in 1996. She would later leave the company to become a freelancer. During Blood: The Last Vampire's production, Frazier's unedited first draft of the English language dialog was unexpectedly used. Frazier would also work on several video games including Ghost in the Shell and Quo Vadis 2. She returned to the United States due to a Japanese anime industry collapse and worked for a company that wanted help in the US. During the Anime Central 2001 costume contest, Frazier served as minister during Robert DeJesus wedding. Frazier would later start the nonprofit Voices For, a group of voice actors who released the album Voices for Peace and donated the money to charities including CARE and Doctors Without Borders.

In January 2022, voice actress Amanda Winn Lee launched a crowdfunding campaign to help fix or replace Frazier's oxygen concentrator. Lee said Frazier was in poor health and had recently been removed from a kidney transplant list.

Buchigiri Part 4
Discussed during several interviews, the worst anime Frazier worked on was Buchigiri 4 for Artland, and she asked to not be credited. Due to constraints (speed and low budget), several cost-cutting measures were used, including outsourcing of cell work to Korea and reduced cell counts. Due to Buchigiri being so despised by staff, the storyboards were later burned at 3 a.m. in a Red Lobster parking lot.

References

 Book references
 
 
 Film references

External links
 
 
 
 

Year of birth missing (living people)
Living people
American film producers
Anime industry
Place of birth missing (living people)
Transgender women